Maximo Tomás Modesti (born February 13, 1952 in Villa María, Córdoba) is an Argentine sport shooter. He won a silver medal in the men's air pistol at the 2003 Pan American Games in Santo Domingo, Dominican Republic, and was selected to represent Argentina, as the oldest member of the team (aged 52), at the 2004 Summer Olympics. Having started shooting for more than three decades, Modesti trained throughout his career for the Rio Shooting Federal Club under head coach Juan Carlos Sampayo.

Modesti qualified for the Argentine squad in pistol shooting at the 2004 Summer Olympics in Athens, by having achieved a mandatory Olympic standard of 576 and picking up the silver medal in the air pistol from the Pan American Games. Modesti fired 559 points to obtain the forty-fourth spot in the men's 10 m air pistol, and then marked a score of 548 to share a thirtieth-place finish with Chinese Taipei's Chang Yi-ning in the men's 50 m pistol, falling short of his chance to advance further into the final for both events.

References

External links
ISSF Profile

1952 births
Living people
Argentine male sport shooters
Olympic shooters of Argentina
Shooters at the 2004 Summer Olympics
Shooters at the 2003 Pan American Games
Shooters at the 2011 Pan American Games
Pan American Games silver medalists for Argentina
Sportspeople from Córdoba Province, Argentina
Pan American Games medalists in shooting
Medalists at the 2003 Pan American Games